Georgia State Route 15 Alternate may refer to:

 Georgia State Route 15 Alternate (Athens–Commerce): an alternate route of State Route 15 that exists in Athens, Arcade, Jefferson, and Commerce
 Georgia State Route 15 Alternate (Cornelia): a former alternate route of State Route 15 that existed in Cornelia

015 Alternate